Children of 9/11: Our Story, also known as Generation 9/11: Our Story, is a documentary film.

Synopsis 
The film follows children born to fathers who died during the September 11 attacks.

Production and distribution 
The documentary was commissioned from Arrow Pictures by Channel 4, PBS, and ARTE France. The film was distributed by PBS International. The film aired in the United Kingdom on Channel 4 on 16 August 2021 and in the United States on PBS on 31 August 2021. The film has a runtime of 120 minutes.

Reception 
The Independent Sean O'Grady, The Daily Telegraph Benji Wilson, and the Financial Times Suzi Feay all rated the film four out of five stars.

References 

2021 films
2021 television films
2021 documentary films
September 11 attacks in popular culture
Documentary films about United States history
American documentary television films
2020s American films